Borkowizna refers to the following places in Poland:

 Borkowizna, Gmina Niedrzwica Duża
 Borkowizna, Gmina Strzyżewice